Calamus draco is an Asian species of rattan plant in the family Arecaceae; its native range is from peninsular Thailand to western Malesia. It is a source of the red resin known as dragon's blood, which is a pigment with medicinal uses.

Description
Calamus draco has stems in clusters forming individual rattan stems climbing up to 15 m., with sheaths to 30 mm diameter. 
Leaf fronds are described as cirrate (with a cirrus: extension of the rattan leaf tip armed with grappling hooks), produced from leaf-sheaths, which are bright green, bearing chocolate-coloured indumentum when young: they are 2.5 m long including petiole (up to 300 mm and armed with groups of short lateral spines to 6 mm long); the cirrus is about 1 m long. About 20 regularly arranged leaflets are on each side of the rachis. 
The mature fruit are more or less ovoid, 28 x 20 mm, covered in 16 vertical rows of scales and may be heavily encrusted with the "dragon's blood"..

References

External links

draco
Flora of Malesia 
Flora of Indo-China
Plants described in 1799